Coleosporium helianthi is a fungal plant pathogen.

References

Fungal plant pathogens and diseases
Pucciniales
Fungi described in 1907